Emerald Software was a video game publisher founded in 1988 by two UK entertainment executives – David Martin of Martech, and Mike Dixon who previously worked with EMI and worked as the company CEO.

The company was headquartered in a three-story Georgian house ("Washington Lodge") in Wilkin Street, Waterford, Ireland.

The ambitious company made a very promising start, but a number of critical delays in the development program eventually led to its closure in 1991.

People 
The company was mostly populated by graduates or placement students from the then-named Waterford Regional Technical College – with some from University College Dublin and others with no formal computer training.

At its peak, Emerald Software employed 17 programmers and 5 graphic artists. These people were spread across 5 departments, loosely split to cover each of the supported development platforms and graphic art – with two additional personnel in Administration and Human Resources.

Development 
The company authored games for the Commodore Amiga, IBM PC, Atari ST, Commodore 64, ZX Spectrum and Amstrad CPC systems.

Development for Amiga and Atari ST games was carried out using Manx C, and Motorola 68000 Assembly language. As both Amiga and ST were 68000-based machines, games were typically authored on the Amiga and then ported using an in-house authored porting / remote-debug / development environment; this allowed the code to be edited on the more capable Amiga, then transmitted to the ST and remotely executed/debugged from the Amiga. The development system was written by Brian Kelly and was based on Lattice C. Graphics and sound routines required re-authoring, but in many cases this was straightforward.

The Amiga games did not run on top of Workbench/AmigaOS – but on a custom-written tiny OS (KOS) with a proprietary disk format which offered higher data capacity per diskette, as well as helping to impede casual copying. This was written by Brian Kelly (the K in KOS).

Development for Spectrum and CPC games took place on a commercially available cross-assembler development environment (PDS) hosted on an IBM PC clone which was connected to a Spectrum. This allowed the game to be authored on the stable PC environment (complete with disk backup), then "blasted" directly into the Spectrum memory to allow for immediate testing. Developing in this manner allowed for significantly higher development speeds than could be achieved by native development on the Spectrum.

As both ZX Spectrum and CPC 464 were Zilog Z80-based machines, CPC versions were usually ported versions of the Spectrum games, with the graphics display on the more-capable CPC reconfigured to be close to that of the more primitive Spectrum. Z80 development was primarily run by Damian Scattergood. The team developed a graphics display system for the CPC 464 that emulated the Spectrum screen layout which meant graphics routines could be ported quickly. Damian also developed his own macro programming language that meant that code could be compiled and shared instantly across both platforms. Z80 development was actually done on a PC where the code could be edited and compiled quickly, and then was ported via RS232 direct onto the Spectrum and CPC machines for testing.

List of games 
The company produced a number of games during its brief existence, to somewhat mixed reviews. These were largely ports of existing arcade games (Vigilante for example) or original movie tie-ins (The Running Man) but there were also some original game concepts (e.g. Phantom Fighter):

The Deep (1988)
If It Moves, Shoot It! (1988)
Phantom Fighter (1988)
The Running Man (1989)
Vigilante (1989)
Michael Jackson's Moonwalker (1989)
Fallen Angel (1989)
Treasure Trap (1990)

The Running Man 
 The intro sequence for the Amiga version of 'The Running Man' occupied practically one full 800k diskette of the two diskette set. Running in a continuous loop till interrupted, it featured digitised voice, music and video sequences from the film, and so was often left running in computer stores as an Amiga feature demonstrator.

References

External links
 Article about Emerald on GameDevelopers.ie

Defunct video game companies of Ireland
Video game companies established in 1988
Video game companies disestablished in 1991
Irish companies established in 1988
1991 disestablishments in Ireland